The 1994 Formula 3000 International Championship was the tenth season of Formula 3000 in Europe. Jean-Christophe Boullion won the championship after eight rounds.

Technical changes

After a year out of Europe, Lola returned with an extensively developed new car. Reynard was still the dominant manufacturer, and retained many components from its previous car while introducing an F1-style high nose.

The regulation requiring long sidepods was removed, which meant that the cars became less pitch-sensitive. The long —vortex generators— on the front wing endplates were banned as part of an ongoing effort to reduce costs.

Drivers and constructors

Calendar
Four F3000 races (Spain, Germany, Belgium and Portugal) were held in Formula One Grand Prix weekends, the highest number in the championship's history so far.

Drivers' Championship

Notes

Complete Overview

R16=retired, but classified NC=not classified  R=retired NS=did not start NQ=did not qualify (21)=place after practice, but grid position not held free 9P=grid position, but started from pit lane

References

International Formula 3000
International Formula 3000 seasons